Jeffrey Weiner (born February 21, 1970 in New York City, New York) is an American businessman. He was the chief executive officer (CEO) of LinkedIn, a business-related social networking website. He started with LinkedIn on December 15, 2008, as Interim President. Weiner played an instrumental role in LinkedIn's acquisition by Microsoft for $26 billion in June 2016. Currently, he is the Executive chairman of Linkedin as in 2022. He is also the founding Partner of Next play venture capital.

Early life and education 
Weiner graduated from  the Wharton School of the University of Pennsylvania in 1992 with a Bachelor of Science in Economics.

Career
Weiner served in various leadership roles at Yahoo! for over seven years beginning in 2001, most recently as the Executive Vice President of Yahoo's Network Division. As EVP of Yahoo, he led a team of over 3,000 employees, managing products reaching over 500 million consumers. While serving Yahoo’s Network Division, he was part of the Search leadership team that directed the acquisition and integration of Inktomi, AltaVista, and FAST as well as the development of Yahoo! Search Technology.

He has worked at Warner Bros. as Vice President of Warner Bros. Online, developing its initial business plan. He was an Executive-in-Residence for leading venture capital firms Accel and Greylock Partners.

In 2009, Weiner implemented the first BizOps team at LinkedIn.

In 2011, Weiner and Reid Hoffman were the U.S. Overall winners of the EY Entrepreneur of the Year Award

In 2014, Weiner was recognized by LinkedIn employees via Glassdoor's annual survey as among "the top 10 CEOs at U.S. Tech Companies".

In 2016, Weiner received media attention for donating his $14 million stock bonus to the pool for LinkedIn employees following a drop in share price.

On February 5, 2020, Weiner announced he will step down as CEO of LinkedIn and become executive chairman in order to focus on closing the network gap and realizing LinkedIn's vision of creating economic opportunity for every member of the global workforce. He named Ryan Roslansky as his replacement.

Other interests
Weiner is also active in the non-profit sector, serving on the Board of Directors of DonorsChoose.org and Malaria No More.

References

External links
 Jeff Weiner profile at Business Insider
 LinkedIn CEO Jeff Weiner at Forbes
 LinkedIn CEO Jeff Weiner Talks About Growth at All Things Digital
 Can Jeff Weiner Realize LinkedIn’s Full Potential? at BusinessWeek
 Jeff Weiner Profile at CNBC
 Profile at World of CEOs DOSSIER
 LinkedIn CEO Jeff Weiner on Connecting Talent with Opportunity 
 Jeff Weiner on Establishing a Plan and Culture for Scaling Stanford University 
 Stanford University, Blitzscaling: Jeff Weiner on Establishing a Plan and Culture for Scaling  (YOUTUBE)

LinkedIn people
American business executives
Living people
Wharton School of the University of Pennsylvania alumni
1970 births
American technology chief executives
Yahoo! people